Hagere Selam may refer to:
 Hagere Selam (Degua Tembien), a town in the Tembien, Tigray, Ethiopia
 Hagere Selam (Sidama), a town in the Sidama zone, SNNPR, Ethiopia